The Syrian Embassy in Kuala Lumpur is the official diplomatic mission to represent the Syrian Arab Republic in Malaysia. It provides the consulate services to all Syrian citizens and those equivalents including who are in Thailand, Singapore, Philippines, Taiwan, and Brunei. And it is one of the 64 diplomatic missions of the Syrian Arab Republic around the world.

History And Establishment 
The Syrian Embassy in Kuala Lumpur was established in 2002 after the formation of the Syrian-Malaysian diplomatic relations during the reign of Prime Minister Mahathir Mohamad.

Functions 
According to the laws of the Syrian Ministry of Foreign Affairs and Expatriates, as well as The International Law, The Syria Embassy in Kuala Lumpur is responsible for:

1: Introducing the Syrian Arab Republic abroad, its renaissance, and its cultural heritage, and emphasizing on its historical role in human civilization and its current development and communication with the world culturally, economically, socially, and in terms of tourism.

2: Managing and caring for the Syrian citizens' affairs abroad and working to strengthen ties and connections between them and the motherland. 

3: Studying the various political matters that are related with its work and collecting information on issues of interest between Syria and Malaysia.

4: Taking care of the interests of Syrian citizens in Malaysia as well as in the countries whose scope of work is covered by the Syrian Embassy in Kuala Lumpur.

References 

 
Syria
Bilateral relations of Syria
Diplomatic missions of Syria